Ronald Belford "Bon" Scott (9 July 1946 – 19 February 1980) was an Australian singer and songwriter. He was the lead vocalist and lyricist of the hard rock band AC/DC from 1974 until his death in 1980.

Born in Forfar in Angus, Scotland, Scott spent his early years in Kirriemuir. He moved to Australia with his family in 1952 at the age of six, living in Melbourne for four years before settling in Fremantle, Western Australia.

With AC/DC, Scott performed on the band's first seven studio albums: High Voltage (1975, Australian release only), T.N.T. (1975, Australian release only), High Voltage (1976, first international release), Dirty Deeds Done Dirt Cheap (1976, not released until 1981 in the United States), Let There Be Rock (1977), Powerage (1978), and Highway to Hell (1979).

Scott formed his first band, the Spektors, in 1964 and became the band's drummer and occasional lead vocalist. He performed with several other bands, including the Valentines and Fraternity, before replacing original lead singer Dave Evans for AC/DC in 1974.
AC/DC's popularity grew throughout the 1970s, initially in Australia, and then internationally. Their 1979 album Highway to Hell reached the top 20 in the United States, and the band seemed on the verge of a commercial breakthrough. However, on 19 February 1980, Scott died after a night out in London with former musician and alleged drug dealer Alistair Kinnear. AC/DC briefly considered disbanding, but the group recruited vocalist Brian Johnson of the British glam rock band Geordie. AC/DC's subsequent album, Back in Black, was released only five months later, and was a tribute to Scott. It went on to become the second-best-selling album of all time.

In the July 2004 issue of Classic Rock, Scott was rated as number one in a list of the "100 Greatest Frontmen of All Time". Hit Parader ranked Scott as fifth on their 2006 list of the 100 Greatest Heavy Metal Vocalists of all time.

Biography

1946–1964: Early years 
Ronald Belford Scott was born on 9 July 1946 at Fyfe Jamieson Maternity Hospital in Forfar, Scotland, the son of Charles Belford "Chick" Scott (1917–1999) and Isabelle Cunningham "Isa" Mitchell (1917–2011). He grew up in Kirriemuir and was his parents' second child; the first-born was a boy, Sandy, who died shortly after birth. A third child, Derek, was born in 1949. His parents ran the family bakery in Kirriemuir's Bank Street. The Scott family emigrated from Scotland to Australia in 1952.

They initially lived in the Melbourne suburb of Sunshine, Victoria, and Scott attended nearby Sunshine Primary School. The nickname "Bon" was acquired shortly after starting school; because there was another Ronald in the class, his classmates played on the phrase "Bonnie Scotland". A fourth child, Graeme, was born in 1953.

In 1956, the family moved to Fremantle. Scott joined the associated Fremantle Scots Pipe Band, learning the drums. He attended North Fremantle Primary School and later John Curtin College of the Arts until he dropped out at the age of 15. He subsequently worked as a farmhand and a crayfisherman, and was later a trainee weighing-machine mechanic. In 1963 he spent a short time in Fremantle Prison's assessment centre and nine months at the Riverbank Juvenile Institution, relating to charges of giving a false name and address to the police, having escaped legal custody, having unlawful carnal knowledge, and stealing  of petrol. He attempted to join the Australian Army, but was rejected and deemed "socially maladjusted".

1964–1970: The Spektors and the Valentines
Scott's vocals were inspired by his idol, Little Richard. After working as a postman, bartender and truck packer, Scott started his first band, the Spektors, in 1964 as drummer and occasional lead singer. In 1966 they merged with another local band, the Winstons, and formed the Valentines, in which Scott was co-lead singer with Vince Lovegrove. The Valentines recorded several songs written by George Young of the Easybeats. "Every Day I Have to Cry" (a song originally written and sung by Arthur Alexander) made the local record chart. In 1970, after gaining a place on the National Top 30 with their single "Juliette", the Valentines disbanded due to artistic differences after a much-publicised drug scandal.

1970–1973: Fraternity
Scott moved to Adelaide in 1970 and joined the progressive rock group Fraternity. Fraternity released the LPs Livestock and Flaming Galah before touring the UK in 1973, where they changed their name to Fang. During this time they played support slots for Status Quo and Geordie, whose front man Brian Johnson would eventually succeed Scott as the lead singer of AC/DC after his death. During this time, on 24 January 1972, Scott married Irene Thornton.

In 1973, just after returning to Australia from the tour of the UK, Fraternity went on hiatus. Scott took a day job at the Wallaroo fertiliser plant and began singing with the Mount Lofty Rangers, a loose collective of musicians helmed by Peter Head (né Beagley) from Headband, who explained, "Headband and Fraternity were in the same management stable and we both split about the same time so the logical thing was to take members from both bands and create a new one ... the purpose of the band was for songwriters to relate to each other and experiment with songs, so it was a hotbed of creativity". Other ex-Fraternity members also played with the band as did Glenn Shorrock pre Little River Band. During this time, Head also helped Scott with his original compositions.

Vince Lovegrove said, "Bon would go to Peter's home after a day of (literally) shovelling shit, and show him musical ideas he had had during his day's work. Bon's knowledge of the guitar was limited, so Peter began teaching him how to bridge chords and construct a song. One of the songs from these sessions was a ballad called 'Clarissa', about a local Adelaide girl. Another was the country-tinged Bin Up in the Hills Too Long, which for me was a sign of things to come with Bon's lyrics; simple, clever, sardonic, tongue-in-cheek ..."

In return, Scott recorded vocals for Mount Lofty Rangers songs "Round & Round" and "Carey Gully". Head released these original recordings in 1996, also teaming up with producer Ted Yanni, another old friend of Scott's, to create an entirely new backing for Round & Round & Round that more accurately reflected the original intentions Head had. Long out of print, and massively bootlegged, this EP finally got an official digital release in June 2010. Unrecorded original compositions of Scott's, "Been up in the Hills Too Long" and "Clarissa" have been recorded by Head on his Peter Head & the Mount Lofty Rangers Lofty album, also released in digital format only in 2011.

About 11 pm on 3 May 1974, at the Old Lion Hotel in North Adelaide, during a rehearsal with the Mount Lofty Rangers, a very drunk, distressed and belligerent Scott had a raging argument with a member of the band. Scott stormed out of the venue, threw a bottle of Jack Daniel's on to the ground, then sped off on his Suzuki GT550 motorbike. Scott suffered serious injuries from the ensuing motorcycle accident, spending three days in a coma and a further 18 days in hospital. Vince Lovegrove and his wife, by then running a booking/management agency, gave Scott odd jobs, such as putting up posters and painting the office during his recovery, and shortly after introduced him to AC/DC who were on the lookout for a new lead singer.

"There was a young, dinky little glam band from Sydney that we both loved called AC/DC ... Before another AC/DC visit, George Young phoned me and said the band was looking for a new singer. I immediately told him that the best guy for the job was Bon. George responded by saying Bon's accident would not allow him to perform, and that maybe he was too old, (9 years older than Angus at the time). Nevertheless I had a meeting with Malcolm and Angus, and suggested Bon as their new singer. They asked me to bring him out to the Pooraka Hotel that night, and to come backstage after the show. When he watched the band, Bon was impressed, and he immediately wanted to join them, but thought they may be a bit too inexperienced and too young. After the show, backstage, Bon expressed his doubts about them being "able to rock". The two Young brothers told Bon he was "too old to rock". The upshot was that they had a jam session that night in the home of Bon's former mentor, Bruce Howe, and at the end of the session, at dawn, it was obvious that AC/DC had found a new singer. And Bon had found a new band."

Like Scott, Malcolm Young and his younger brother Angus Young of AC/DC were born in Scotland before emigrating to Australia in their childhood with their family. Fraternity later reformed and replaced Scott with Jimmy Barnes.

1974–1980: AC/DC

Scott's wife, Irene Thornton, later wrote, "The first time Bon saw AC/DC was in August 1974. They came through Adelaide with the Lou Reed and Stevie Wright tour, and played their own show at the Pooraka Hotel... The first time I saw AC/DC was at the Pooraka Hotel in September. 'Get up there, Bon,' Vince kept saying. The band didn't have a singer that night; they were playing instrumental versions of old rock 'n' roll standards. The boys ripped through all these classic numbers and then finally, with enough pressure from Vince, Bon climbed onto the stage. I didn't realise that AC/DC had just sacked Dave Evans and they wanted Bon to replace him. Like Bon, the Youngs were Scottish, so there was an instant bond."

Scott replaced Dave Evans as the lead singer of AC/DC on 24 October 1974, when it became obvious the band and Evans were heading in different directions, with Evans having personal clashes with band members and management. Scott's appointment coincided with him working as a chauffeur for the band at the time until an audition promoted him to lead singer.

With the Young brothers as lead and rhythm guitarists, session drummer Tony Currenti (see AC/DC line-ups) and George Young as a temporary bassist, AC/DC released High Voltage, their first LP in Australia, in February 1975. Within a few months Currenti was replaced by Phil Rudd and Mark Evans was hired as a permanent bassist, and AC/DC began recording their second album T.N.T., which was released in Australia in December 1975. The first AC/DC album to gain international distribution however was a compilation of tracks from the first two albums, also entitled High Voltage, which was released in May 1976. Another studio album, Dirty Deeds Done Dirt Cheap, was released in September of the same year, but only in Australia; the international version of the album was released in December with a different track listing. The album was not released in the US until March 1981.

In the following years, AC/DC gained further success with their albums Let There Be Rock and Powerage. The 1978 release of Powerage marked the debut of bassist Cliff Williams (who had replaced Mark Evans), and with its harder riffs, followed the blueprint set by Let There Be Rock. Only one single was released from Powerage—"Rock 'n' Roll Damnation"—which gave AC/DC their highest chart position at the time, reaching #24. An appearance at the Apollo Theatre in Glasgow during the Powerage tour was recorded and released as If You Want Blood You've Got It.

The band's sixth album, Highway To Hell, was produced by Robert "Mutt" Lange and was released in 1979. It became AC/DC's first LP to break the US top 100, eventually reaching #17, and it propelled AC/DC into the top ranks of hard rock acts.

On 9 February 1980; AC/DC appeared on Aplauso TV (Spain) where they played "Beating Around the Bush", "Girls Got Rhythm", and "Highway to Hell", this would be Bon Scott's last public appearance with AC/DC before his death.

Marriage and alleged children
Scott met Irene Thornton, from Adelaide, in 1971 while he was the lead singer for Fraternity. They married in 1972. After two years of marriage, they separated before divorcing in 1977 but remained friends until his death.

Michael Browning, who managed AC/DC in their early years, stated in his book on managing AC/DC, Dog Eat Dog, that he visited Scott in hospital in Melbourne in 1975 after Scott had overdosed on drugs. Browning claimed "Bon was bragging to me the last time he was in that hospital he was visiting two separate girls, both unknown to each other, who were both giving birth to his kids at the same time. So there's at least two of Bon Scott's children out there, or at least two I can vouch for."

Death

On 15 February 1980, Scott attended a session where Malcolm and Angus Young were working on the beginnings of two songs that would later be recorded on the Back in Black album: "Have a Drink On Me" and "Let Me Put My Love Into You", with Scott accompanying on drums rather than singing or writing lyrics.

Days earlier, Scott had gone with Mick Cocks to visit their friends the French group Trust in the Scorpio Sound studio in London, where they recorded the album Répression; Scott was working on the English adaptation of texts by Bernie Bonvoisin for the English version of the album. During this visit, the musicians did a jam session of "Ride On". This improvised session was Scott's last recording.

Sometime during the late evening of 18 February and early morning of 19 February 1980, Scott passed out and died at the age of 33. He had just visited a London club called the Music Machine (currently known as KOKO). He was left to sleep in a Renault 5 owned by his friend Alistair Kinnear, at 67 Overhill Road in East Dulwich. Later that day, Kinnear found Scott, lifeless, and alerted the authorities. Scott was taken to King's College Hospital in Camberwell, where he was pronounced dead on arrival. The official report of the coroner concluded that Scott had died of "acute alcohol poisoning" and classified it as "death by misadventure".

The chronology of events on 19 February and when exactly Scott was found dead has been challenged by Jesse Fink's 2017 book Bon: The Last Highway, which quotes the late UFO guitarist Paul Chapman as having been informed early that morning by Scott's friend Joe Fury that Scott was dead. Kinnear said he found Scott in the evening. Chapman claims Scott and Fury were with him the previous evening of 18 February and that Scott left his apartment to buy heroin, never to return.

Fink's book also claims Scott and Kinnear were not alone in East Dulwich but with a third person, Zena Kakoulli, who stayed over at Kinnear's apartment while Scott remained in the parked Renault. An updated edition of Fink's book released in 2018 produces new evidence that a fourth individual, Kakoulli's husband the rock musician Peter Perrett, was also with Scott, Kinnear and Kakoulli. Fink contends that pulmonary aspiration of vomit was the cause of Scott's death via a suspected heroin overdose. As part of the funeral arrangements, Scott's body was embalmed by Desmond Henley; it was later cremated, and Scott's ashes were interred by his family at Fremantle Cemetery in Fremantle.

Shortly after Scott's death, the remaining members of AC/DC briefly considered disbanding; however, it was eventually decided that Scott would have wanted them to continue, and with the Scott family's encouragement, the band hired Brian Johnson as their new vocalist. Five months after Scott's death, AC/DC finished the work they began with Scott and released Back in Black as a tribute to him. The issue of whether Scott's lyrics were used, uncredited, on the album remains an enduring topic of debate. In Fink's Bon: The Last Highway, he produces interview quotes from Angus Young admitting that Scott's lyrics were at least partly used and from Vince Lovegrove that Scott's family receive royalties for Back in Black. Scott's girlfriends Silver Smith (who died in 2016) and "Holly X" (a pseudonym) both claim Scott wrote the song "You Shook Me All Night Long".

Legacy

Landmarks

Australia

His grave site has become a cultural landmark; more than 28 years after Scott's death, the National Trust of Australia declared his grave important enough to be included on the list of classified heritage places. It is reportedly the most visited grave in Australia. On 7 July 2006, to mark his 60th birthday, the Metropolitan Cemeteries Board completed refurbishments on the Bon Scott Grave Area. This consisted of a Bon Scott Arch and Memorial Entrance gate off Carrington Street in the north-west corner of Fremantle Cemetery. On 9 July 2006, sixty years to the day from Scott's birth, the bronze plaque was stolen from the site.

A bronze statue of Scott was unveiled at Fremantle Fishing Boat Harbour in Western Australia on 24 February 2008. The statue portrays Scott atop a Marshall amplifier.

ACDC Lane is a street in the central business district of Melbourne. It was renamed on 1 October 2004 as a tribute to AC/DC. The trademark lightning bolt or slash ("/") used to separate the AC and the DC in the band's name contravened the naming policy of the Office of the Registrar of Geographic Names, so the punctuation was omitted on the street sign. Melbourne's Lord Mayor John So launched ACDC Lane with the words, "As the song says, there is a highway to hell, but this is a laneway to heaven. Let us rock". Bagpipers then played "It's a Long Way to the Top (If You Wanna Rock 'n' Roll)". Those were all songs from Bon Scott era. The lane contains a rock 'n' roll nightclub called the Cherry Bar.

Scotland
On 6 May 2006, the town of Kirriemuir in Scotland held a service and unveiled a Caithness stone slab commemorating the singer. A message was read from a long-time friend and fellow member of the Valentines, Vince Lovegrove, in which he said:

A life-sized bronze statue of Scott was unveiled by former AC/DC bass player Mark Evans in Bellies Brae Car Park in Kirriemuir on 30 April 2016, during the 10th anniversary of the Bonfest music festival. Kirriemuir hosts an annual festival known as "Bonfest" as a tribute to Bon Scott and AC/DC. It was originally held in July on the weekend closest to his birthday but moved to May because of other events in the local area during July. The statue was commissioned by local community group DD8 Music and created by John McKenna.

Posthumous releases
AC/DC released a box set entitled Bonfire as a tribute to Scott on 18 November 1997. It contains four albums; a remastered version of Back in Black; a "rarities" album with alternate takes, outtakes, and stray live cuts, Volts; and two live albums, Live from the Atlantic Studios and Let There Be Rock: The Movie. Live from the Atlantic Studios was recorded on 7 December 1977 at the Atlantic Studios in New York City. Let There Be Rock: The Movie is a double album which was recorded on 9 December 1979 at the Pavillon de Paris in Paris, and was the soundtrack of the motion picture, AC/DC: Let There Be Rock.

Accolades, awards and tributes
AC/DC's seventh studio album Back In Black was released as a dedication and tribute to Scott. In 2003, Scott was posthumously inducted into the Rock and Roll Hall of Fame as a member of AC/DC with his nephews present to accept the honour in his place.

In 2003, Scott's final studio album with AC/DC, 1979's Highway to Hell ranked 199 on Rolling Stones "The 500 Greatest Albums of All Time". In 2004, the song "Highway to Hell" that Scott co-wrote with Malcolm and Angus Young ranked 254 on Rolling Stones The 500 Greatest Songs of All Time.

In the July 2004 issue of UK magazine Classic Rock, Scott was rated as number one in a list of the "100 Greatest Frontmen," ahead of Freddie Mercury and Robert Plant.

The French rock band Trust wrote their hit song "Ton dernier acte" ("Your Last Act") in memory of Scott in 1980. German hard rock band Kingdom Come wrote and recorded a song titled "Bon Scott" for their album, Ain't Crying for the Moon, as a tribute to the former AC/DC frontman. Romanian hard rock group Iris recorded the song "Ultimul mic dejun al lui Bon" ("Bon's Last Breakfast") as a tribute to Scott, released on their 1997 album Lună plină.

Many artists perform live covers of songs that Scott wrote with AC/DC as a tribute to him. On 19 February 2005, the 25th anniversary of Scott's death, thrash metal band Megadeth performed a cover of "Problem Child" as a tribute. Singer and guitarist Dave Mustaine talked about how much Scott had influenced him. Hard rock band Guns N' Roses frequently perform "Whole Lotta Rosie" in concert and covered it in 1987. AC/DC performed their song "Ride On" only one time in 2001 as a tribute to Scott.

Literature
Scott is the subject of two biographies: Clinton Walker's Highway to Hell (1994 and updated in 2015) and Jesse Fink's Bon: The Last Highway (2017 and updated in 2018 and 2022). Fink's book claims that Scott died of a heroin overdose, while Walker backs the coroner's finding of alcohol poisoning. The controversial point that he and Walker both agree on is that many of Scott's lyrics were co-opted, uncredited, into Back in Black. Other books about Scott include Irene Thornton's memoir My Bon Scott (2014, retitled outside Australia as Have a Drink on Me), the variously authored tribute Live Wire (2015), and J.P. Quinton's "historical fiction" Bad Boy Boogie (2016). Scott's time in the pre-AC/DC Australian band Fraternity is documented in Victor Marshall's Fraternity: Pub Rock Pioneers (2021).

Awards

West Australian Music Industry Awards
The West Australian Music Industry Awards are annual awards celebrating achievements for Western Australian music. They commenced in 1985.

|-
| 2005 || Bon Scott || Hall of Fame || 
|-

References

Further reading
 .
 .
 .
 .
 
 .
 .
 .
 .

External links

 
 

1946 births
1980 deaths
AC/DC members
Accidental deaths in London
Alcohol-related deaths in England
APRA Award winners
Australian tenors
Australian multi-instrumentalists
Australian rock singers
Australian songwriters
Burials at Fremantle Cemetery
Musicians from Western Australia
Naturalised citizens of Australia
People educated at John Curtin College of the Arts
People from Fremantle
People from Kirriemuir
Scottish emigrants to Australia
20th-century Australian male singers
Blues rock musicians